Kodiyathur  is a gram panchayat in Kozhikode district in the state of Kerala, India.

Kodiyathur is surrounded by two rivers, Chaliyar and Iruvazhinji.   It is under Thiruvambady legislative constituency. The name Kodiyathur comes from "Kodi" Kuthiya "Uru". The Freedom fighter Muhammed Abdur Rahiman died near Kodiyathur. And social worker Bp. Moideen is also from here. The west of Kodiyathur panchayath is Chathamangalam panchayath, east is Karssery panchayath, and north is Mukkam municipality.

Kodiyathur panchayath has higher literacy rate compared to Kerala. In 2011, literacy rate of Kodiyathur village was 94.82% compared to 94.00% of Kerala. In Kodiyathur Male literacy stands at 96.28% while female literacy rate was 93.43%.

To reach Kodiyathur from Calicut:

Calicut-Chevayur-Medical college-Kuttikattur-Mavoor-Kodiyathur

Demographics
The Kodiyathur village has population of 29816 of which 14725 are males while 15091 are females as per Population Census 2011.

Educational institutions
1.PTM HSS Kodiyathur

2. Govt. HSS Cheruvadi

3. St. Thomas HSS Thottumukkam

4.Wadi Rahma Senior Secondary School

5.Lead Square, Wadi Rahma

6. Govt. UP School Thottumukkam

7. SKA UP School South Kodiyathur

8. Govt. LP School Kazhuthuttippuraya

9. Govt. LP School Pannicode

10.Govt. LP School Chullikkaparamba

11.Govt Mappila Upper Primary School kodiyathur

Transportation
Kodiyathur is well connected Road network and Bus route with near by towns like Kunnamangalam, Mukkam, Mavoor, Thiruvambady, Thamarassery, Omassery, Areekode, Edavannapara. Village connects to other part of India through Calicut city on the west and Kunnamangalam town on the North west. National highway No.66 passes through Kozhikode and the northern stretch connects to Mangalore, Goa and Mumbai. The southern stretch connects to Cochin and Trivandrum. The National Highway No.212 going through Koduvally connects to Kalpetta, Mysore and Bangalore. The nearest airport is Calicut International Airport which is 27 km away.  The nearest railway station is Kozhikode Railway Station.

Moral Policing
In 2011, a 26-year-old youth was killed by a mob in Kodiyathur for allegedly having an affair with a married woman. All of the accused were sentenced to life imprisonment in October 2014.

Major Towns

 Kodiyathur

2. Cheruvadi

3. Pannikode

4. Eranjimavu

5. Thottumukkam

6. Thottumukkam Pallithazhe

7. Gothambaroad

8. West Kodiyathur

References

Villages in Kozhikode district
Thamarassery area
Gram panchayats in Kozhikode district

4.https://wadirahma.school/